Robert Shedrick Mitchell (March 31, 1900 – May, 1971), nicknamed "Pud", was an American Negro league catcher in the 1920s.

A native of Sparta, Illinois, Mitchell was the twin brother of fellow Negro leaguer George Mitchell. He made his Negro leagues debut in 1923 for the Birmingham Black Barons. The following season, he was a batterymate of pitching brother George with the St. Louis Stars. Mitchell died in St. Louis, Missouri in 1971 at age 71.

References

External links
 and Baseball-Reference Black Baseball stats and Seamheads

1900 births
1971 deaths
Birmingham Black Barons players
St. Louis Stars (baseball) players
Baseball catchers
Baseball players from Illinois
People from Sparta, Illinois
Twin sportspeople
American twins
20th-century African-American sportspeople